André Kilian (born 18 May 1987) is a German football coach and former player who played as a left-back or defensive midfielder.

Career
Kilian was born in Herne. He played in the Oberliga Westfalen and the Regionalliga West for FC Schalke 04 II however never broke through to the first team. In 2010, he moved abroad to Australia to play for the A-League club North Queensland Fury, before returning to Germany a year later to sign for FC Homburg.

External links
 North Queensland Fury profile

References

1987 births
Living people
People from Herne, North Rhine-Westphalia
Sportspeople from Arnsberg (region)
Footballers from North Rhine-Westphalia
German footballers
Association football fullbacks
Regionalliga players
A-League Men players
SC Westfalia Herne players
FC Schalke 04 II players
FC 08 Homburg players
Northern Fury FC players
German expatriate footballers
German expatriate sportspeople in Australia
Expatriate soccer players in Australia